The NHL on ABC is an American presentation of National Hockey League (NHL) games produced by ESPN, and televised on ABC in the United States.

The network first broadcast NHL games during the 1993 Stanley Cup playoffs on April 18, 1993, under a two-year time-buy agreement with ESPN. After the two years, the NHL left ABC for newcomer Fox, while remaining with ESPN.

As part of a joint contract with ESPN, which was reached right before the 1998–99 season, the NHL returned to ABC on February 6, 2000, with their coverage of the 2000 NHL All-Star Game in Toronto. Regular season game telecasts returned to ABC on March 18, 2000. ABC also gained the rights to select weekend games from each round of the Stanley Cup playoffs and the last five games of the Stanley Cup Finals. After the 2004 Stanley Cup Finals, the NHL left ABC again, this time for NBC because Disney executives admitted that they overpaid for the 1999–2004 deal. ESPN, who was set to continue with the NHL, later dropped it from their schedules after the 2004–05 lockout.

On March 10, 2021, ESPN announced a new contract to hold half of the NHL's media rights beginning in the 2021–22 season. In this deal, ABC will broadcast up to 10 regular season games per-season, primarily late-season games of the week (branded as ABC Hockey Saturday presented by Expedia  for sponsorship purposes), and the All-Star Game. ABC exclusively televises the Stanley Cup Finals in even-numbered years. All games carried by ABC are streamed on ESPN+.

History

Before the 1992–93 NHL season
After being dropped by NBC after the  season, the NHL did not maintain a national television contract in the United States. In response to this, the league put together a network of independent stations covering approximately 55% of the country.

Games typically aired on Monday nights (beginning at 8 p.m. Eastern Time) or Saturday afternoons. The package was offered to local stations without a rights fee. Profits would instead be derived from the advertising, which was about evenly split between the network and the local station. The Monday night games were often billed as "The NHL Game of the Week".

Initially, the Monday night package was marketed to ABC affiliates; the idea being that ABC carried NFL football games on Monday nights in the fall and (starting in May ) Major League Baseball games on Monday nights in the spring and summer, stations would want the hockey telecasts to create a year-round Monday night sports block; however, very few ABC stations chose to pick up the package.

In , ABC was contracted to televise Game 7 of the Stanley Cup Finals. Since the Finals ended in five games, the contract was void. Had there been a seventh game, then Al Michaels would have called play-by-play alongside Bobby Clarke (color commentator). Jim McKay would host the seventh game in the studio, and Frank Gifford (reporter, who would have been in the winning team's dressing room to interview players and coaches as well as hand the phone to the winning team's coach that would have allowed him to talk to both President Jimmy Carter and Prime Minister Pierre Trudeau). This would give Michaels the honor of being the first to provide the play-by-play in four of the five major professional sports, having called the Super Bowl, the World Series, and NBA Finals. The game would have started at 5:10 p.m. Eastern Daylight Time on a Saturday, replacing Wide World of Sports and local news shows that typically followed it on ABC stations in the Eastern and Central time zones.

It was also around this time that ABC offered the NHL a limited deal, splitting the network and show the NHL in the Northeast and Midwest and NASCAR in the South on Sunday afternoons, that NHL president John Ziegler Jr. quickly rejected.

ABC's coverage of the Winter Olympics
Even though ABC didn't yet televise National Hockey League games, they were the American network broadcast home of the Winter Olympic games beginning in 1964 and continuing through the 1988 Winter Games from Calgary. For the ice hockey events, employed Curt Gowdy for play-by-play duties in 1968 and 1976 (NBC had the broadcasting rights for the 1972 Games in the interim) Games. Gowdy worked with Brian Conacher for the 1976 ice hockey events.

For years later at Lake Placid, ABC was on hand for a medal-round men's ice hockey game that would soon become known the "Miracle on Ice". On February 22, 1980, the United States team, made up of amateur and collegiate players and led by coach Herb Brooks, defeated the Soviet team, which consisted of veteran professional players with significant experience in international play. The rest of the United States (except those who watched the game live on Canadian television) had to wait to see the game, as ABC decided to broadcast the late-afternoon game on tape delay in prime time. Sportscaster Al Michaels, who was calling the game on ABC along with former Montreal Canadiens goalie Ken Dryden, picked up on the countdown in his broadcast, and delivered his famous call:

Al Michaels continued serving as ABC's lead play-by-play announcer for their ice hockey coverage for their next two Winter Olympics both with lead color commentator Ken Dryden. In 1984 from Sarajevo, Mike Eruzione, who was the captain of the gold medal-winning United States ice hockey team from 1980, worked with Don Chevrier. For ABC's final Winter Olympics four years later, Eruzione was this time, paired with Jiggs McDonald.

ABC Radio coverage (1989–1991)
In 1989, the NHL signed a two-year contract (lasting through the  season) with ABC Radio for the broadcast rights to the All-Star Game and Stanley Cup Finals. ABC Radio named Don Chevrier and Phil Esposito as their main commentating crew.

Time-buy deal with ESPN (1993–1994)

In the  season, ABC televised five weekly playoff telecasts (the first three weeks were regional coverage of various games and two national games) on Sunday afternoons starting on April 18. This marked the first time that playoff National Hockey League games were broadcast on American network television since 1975 (when NBC was the NHL's American broadcast television partner). In the  season, ABC televised six weekly regional telecasts on the last three 
Sunday afternoons beginning on March 27, 1994. This marked the first time that regular season National Hockey League games were broadcast on American network television since  (again when NBC was the NHL's American broadcast television partner). ABC then televised three weeks worth of playoff games on first three Sundays – the final game was Game 1 of the Eastern Conference Semifinals between the Boston Bruins and the New Jersey Devils, a game that was aired nationally. The network did not televise the Stanley Cup Finals, which instead, were televised nationally by ESPN and by Prime Ticket in Los Angeles and MSG Network in New York. Games televised on ABC were not subject to blackout.

These broadcasts (just as was the case with the 2000–2004 package) were essentially, time-buys by ESPN. In other words, ABC would sell three-hour blocks of airtime to ESPN, who in return, would produce and distribute the telecasts. Overall, ABC averaged a 1.7 rating for those two seasons.

When the NHL television contract went up for negotiation in early 1994, Fox (which was in the process of launching its sports division after acquiring the rights to the National Football Conference of the NFL) and CBS (which was hoping to land a major sports contract to replace the NFL rights that they lost to Fox and Major League Baseball rights that they lost to ABC and NBC) competed heavily for the package. On September 9, 1994, the National Hockey League reached a five-year, US$155 million contract with Fox for the broadcast television rights to the league's games, beginning with the 1994–95 season.

Announcers

Studio host
 John Saunders

Play-by-play
 Gary Thorne
 Mike Emrick
 Al Michaels (1993)
 Tom Mees (1994)
 Bob Miller (1993–94)
 Sam Rosen (1993–94)

Color commentators
 Bill Clement
 John Davidson
 Darren Pang (1993–94)
 Joe Micheletti (1993–94)
 Jim Schoenfeld (1993)

Reporters
 Al Morganti
 Tom Mees
 Bob Neumeier
 Brenda Brenon
 Mark Jones

Schedules

1993–94

April 17, May 1, 24: Playoffs

Stanley Cup playoff commentator crews

1993

1994

NHL returns to ABC (2000–2004)

In August 1998, ABC, ESPN, and ESPN2 signed a five-year television deal with the NHL, worth a total of approximately US$600 million (or $120 million per year), beginning with the league's 1999–2000 season. The $120 million per year that ABC and ESPN paid for rights dwarfed the $5.5 million that the NHL received from American national broadcasts in the 1991–92 season. ABC's terms of this deal included: rights to the NHL All-Star Game, 4 to 5 weeks of regular season action, with three games a week, weekend Stanley Cup Playoff games, and Games 3 to 7 of the Stanley Cup Finals.

As previously noted, much like ABC's initial contract with the NHL in the 1992–93 and 1993–94 seasons, ESPN essentially purchased time on ABC to air selected NHL games on the broadcast network. This was noted in copyright tags at the conclusion of the telecasts (i.e., "The preceding program has been paid for by ESPN, Inc."). ESPN later signed a similar television rights contract with the National Basketball Association in 2002, allowing it to produce and broadcast NBA games on ABC under a similar time buy arrangement on the broadcast network.

In May 2004, NBC and ESPN reached an agreement to broadcast NHL games beginning in the 2004–05 season, which would end up being canceled as a result of the 2004–05 NHL lockout; ESPN later withdrew from the deal in favor of OLN, which wound up being rebranded as NBCSN in 2012. In the interval between the 2004 Stanley Cup Finals and the start of the 2005–06 season, several ABC affiliates, including WDTN in Dayton, Ohio (a secondary market for the Columbus Blue Jackets) and WAND in Springfield, Illinois (which is served by the Chicago Blackhawks and the St. Louis Blues), affiliated with NBC.

Regular season
As previously mentioned, ABC televised four to five weeks worth of regional games on Saturday afternoons, typically beginning in January or March for the first two seasons.

Announcers

Studio personalities
 John Saunders – lead studio host
 Steve Levy – fill-in studio host
 John Davidson – lead studio analyst (1999–2002)
 Barry Melrose – NHL All-Star Game and Stanley Cup Finals studio analyst (1999–2002); lead studio analyst (2003–04)
 Darren Pang – Stanley Cup Finals studio analyst (2003–2004)

Stanley Cup Finals hosts
 Al Michaels (2000–2002)
 Chris Berman (2003)

Play-by play announcer
 Gary Thorne
 Steve Levy
 Mike Emrick
 Dave Strader (2000–2002)

Color commentators
 Bill Clement
 John Davidson (2003–2004)
 Darren Pang
 Barry Melrose (1999–2002)
 Brian Engblom (2002–04)
 Brian Hayward (2000 Stanley Cup playoffs)
 Jim Schoenfeld (2001–2002)

Reporters
 Brian Engblom – co-lead rinkside reporter
 Darren Pang – co-lead rinkside reporter
 Steve Levy – NHL All-Star Game and Stanley Cup Finals reporter
 Sam Ryan
 Erin Andrews
 Joe Micheletti
 Christine Simpson (2001–2003)
 Daryl Reaugh (2000 Stanley Cup playoffs)
 Mickey Redmond (2001; Detroit Red Wings)
 Tony Granato (2002 Stanley Cup playoffs)

1999–2004 Schedules

1999–2000

2000–01

2001–02

2002–03

2003–04

NHL All-Star Game (1999–2004)

Notes
 Denis Leary was the third-man in the broadcast booth and called the final 40 minutes of the 2001 All-Star Game at Pepsi Center in Denver.
 Because ABC Sports had rights to the NHL All-Star Game and the National Football League's Pro Bowl, ABC aired both games on the same day from 2000 through 2003, excluding 2002. ABC dubbed these doubleheaders as “All-Star Sunday”.

Stanley Cup Playoffs (2000–2004)
Besides the National Hockey League All-Star Game, ABC televised Games 3–7 of the Stanley Cup Finals in prime time. In the league's previous broadcast television deal with Fox, the network split coverage of the Stanley Cup Finals with ESPN. Games 1, 5 and 7 were usually scheduled to be televised by Fox; Games 2, 3, 4 and 6 by ESPN. The consequence was that – except for 1995, when Fox did televise Game 4 – the decisive game was never on network television.

2003 was the only year that ABC broadcast both the NBA and the Stanley Cup Finals that involved teams from one city in the same year, as both the New Jersey Nets and the New Jersey Devils were in their respective league's finals. During ABC's broadcast of Game 3 between the San Antonio Spurs and the Nets in New Jersey on June 8, Brad Nessler said that ABC was in a unique situation getting ready for both that game and Game 7 of the Stanley Cup Finals between the Devils and the Mighty Ducks of Anaheim the following night, also at Continental Airlines Arena. Gary Thorne mentioned this the following night, and thanked Nessler for promoting ABC's broadcast of Game 7 of the Stanley Cup Finals.

Following the 2003–04 season, ESPN was only willing to renew its contract for two additional years at $60 million per year. ABC wanted to televised the Stanley Cup Finals games played on weekend afternoons (including a potential Game 7). Disney executives later conceded that they overpaid for the 1999–2004 deal, so the company's offer to renew the television rights was lower in 2004.

ABC ended their second run with the NHL with Game 7 of the 2004 Stanley Cup Finals on June 7. There, the Tampa Bay Lightning defeated the Calgary Flames 2–1 to clinch their first ever Stanley Cup.

ABC concluded their coverage of Game 7 with a montage of highlights from the 2004 Stanley Cup Finals that were set to the song "Shine" by Andy Stochansky.

Stanley Cup playoffs commentating crews

Stanley Cup Finals commentating crews

Second return to ABC (2021–present)

On March 10, 2021, ESPN announced a new, seven-year broadcast deal with the NHL, which included games on ESPN, ABC, and ESPN+ beginning in the 2021–22 season. At least 25 regular-season games will be scheduled to air on ESPN or ABC, along with half of the first two rounds of the Stanley Cup Playoffs, and one conference final each year. ESPN/ABC have first choice of which conference final series to air. ABC will exclusively broadcast four Stanley Cup Finals over the life of the contract, with the option to simulcast each game on ESPN+, as well as produce alternate broadcasts to air on other ESPN platforms. 

The 2022 Stanley Cup Finals marked the first to be broadcast in their entirety on over-the-air television since 1980, as the Finals had since either been partially or exclusively carried on cable. Due to the current arrangement of ABC's sports programming being produced and co-branded by ESPN, the broadcasts carry the NHL on ESPN production and branding.

ABC's first game back featured the New York Rangers and the Boston Bruins in the annual Thanksgiving Showdown on November 26, 2021. After ABC aired the 2022 NHL All-Star Game, the network aired a weekly game under the ABC Hockey Saturday branding, which began on February 26. The package primarily aired on Saturday afternoons, with one primetime game on March 19 to accommodate afternoon coverage of the 2022 NCAA Division I women's basketball tournament. All games broadcast by ABC are simulcast on ESPN+.

ABC did not air a full 30 minute or hour long pregame show before their games in 2021, instead opting for an abbreviated 15-minute pregame show presented by Verizon. However, ABC aired a full 30-minute pregame show on April 23, as a lead-out of their Bundesliga soccer coverage. They will air a 30 minute pregame show for games outside of the primetime slot. If time permits, ABC will also air a short postgame show until 6 p.m. ET, so most ABC affiliates on the East Coast can show their local news or ABC World News Tonight. For the Stanley Cup Finals, all broadcasts began at 8 p.m. ET, allowing for a short pre-game show prior to puck drop (by contrast to the NBA Finals, which has preferred a later, 9 p.m. ET window, with ABC leading into the game with half-hour Jimmy Kimmel Live! specials and NBA Countdown).

In the 2022–23 season, ABC will air 15 games, including four double-headers, the NHL Stadium Series game, and a triple-header on April 8; the Thanksgiving Showdown moved to TNT, which will also cover this season's Stanley Cup Finals.

Announcers

Studio personalities
 Steve Levy – lead studio host and occasional play-by-play (2021–present)
 John Buccigross – fill-in studio host and play-by-play (2021–present)
 Arda Ocal – game break and fill-in studio host (2023–present)
 Barry Melrose – studio analyst (2021–present)
 Mark Messier – studio analyst (2021–present)
 Chris Chelios – studio analyst (2021–present)
 Brian Boucher – color commentator/Inside the Glass and studio analyst (2022–present, select games)
 P. K. Subban – studio analyst (2023–present)

Play-by-play
 Sean McDonough – lead play-by-play (2021–present)
 Steve Levy – lead studio host and occasional play-by-play (2021–present)
 John Buccigross – fill-in studio host and play-by-play (2021–present)
 Bob Wischusen – play-by-play (2023–present)

Color commentators/Inside-the-Glass analysts
 Ray Ferraro – lead color commentator/Inside the Glass analyst (2021–present)
 A. J. Mleczko – #3 color commentator/Inside the Glass analyst (2021–present, select games)
 Brian Boucher – #2 color commentator/Inside the Glass and studio analyst (2022–present, select games)

Ice level reporters
 Emily Kaplan – lead ice level reporter (2022–present)
 Leah Hextall – ice level reporter (2023–present)
 Kevin Weekes – ice level reporter (2023–present)

Contributors
 Laura Rutledge – contributor (2022–present)
 Marty Smith – contributor (2023–present)

Rules analyst
 Dave Jackson – rules analyst (2021–present)

Schedules

2021–22

Notes
 Outside of the Thanksgiving Showdown, ESPN produced an “IceCast” alternate broadcast. These broadcasts aired on ESPN+, alongside the ABC broadcast.

2022–23

Notes
 ESPN will produce alternate broadcasts of select games that will stream on ESPN+ along with the ABC broadcast. Those include the “Star Watch”, “Puck Possessor”, or an “All-12” broadcast for the Stadium Series.

NHL All-Star Game (2022–2028)

Notes
 2023 - ESPN produced an “All-Star Watch” altcast to go along with the ABC broadcast on ESPN+.

Stanley Cup Playoffs (2022–present)
As part of ESPN's new deal, ABC also gained rights to part of half of the Stanley Cup playoffs, and exclusive rights to the entire Stanley Cup Finals in even-numbered years, the first time the entire series will air on broadcast television since 1980, with games prominently airing on weekends. However, in 2022, ABC did not air any early round playoff games on network television. Furthermore, ABC was supposed to simulcast Game 7 of the 2022 Eastern Conference Finals, had the series gone that far. However, it was not necessary as the series ended in six games, marking the first time no games were aired on broadcast network. Early round playoff games are expected to return to ABC in 2023.

Stanley Cup Finals

Notes
 All games in series are simulcast on ESPN+, and included an “IceCast” alternate broadcast.
 ABC's coverage in 2022 marked the first time the entire Stanley Cup Finals was carried exclusively on American broadcast television since 1980, and the first time ABC aired the Finals since 2004.

Nielsen ratings

National Hockey League coverage on ABC owned-and-operated television stations

References

External links
NHL News & Videos - ABC News
Sports Media Watch: How Disney outfoxed the NHL.

American Broadcasting Company original programming
ABC Sports
ABC Radio Networks
ABC Radio Sports
ABC
ABC
1990s American television series
2000s American television series
2020s American television series
1993 American television series debuts
1994 American television series endings
2000 American television series debuts
2004 American television series endings
2021 American television series debuts
American television series revived after cancellation